Regional Science Policy & Practice (RSPP), since 2019 publish six issues per year, is a peer-reviewed academic journal published by Wiley-Blackwell on behalf of the Regional Science Association International. It was established in 2008 and covers regional science topics from disciplines such as planning, economics, environmental science, geography, and public policy.

External links 
 

Wiley-Blackwell academic journals
English-language journals
Environmental science journals
Publications established in 2008
Quarterly journals
Urban studies and planning journals